CEDEC Awards are annually presented by Tokyo, Japan-based CEDEC (CESA Developers conference) for outstanding game developers and games. The awards started in 2008.

Selection Process 
The CEDEC Awards began in 2008, at the "CEDEC 2008" conference, on its 10th anniversary. The main awards were based on suggestions by the public, from which nominations were chosen by the CEDEC advisory board, which were then voted on by the advisory board, and CEDEC students.

Award list

See also
Japan Game Awards
Game Developers Choice Awards

References

External links 
CEDEC,  official website

Video game awards
Japanese awards
21st-century awards